Kaat Dumarey (born 8 September 1999) is a Belgian female acrobatic gymnast. With partners Ineke Van Schoor and Julie Van Gelder, Dumarey achieved bronze in the 2014 Acrobatic Gymnastics World Championships.

In June 2015 she participated at the 2015 European Games along with partners Julie van Gelder and Ineke van Schoor. They won the gold medal in the all-around event, with a score of 86.480. They also posted the highest score on their balance and dynamic routines, with a 28.700 and a 28.450, respectively.

References

External links

 

1999 births
Living people
Belgian acrobatic gymnasts
Female acrobatic gymnasts
Gymnasts at the 2015 European Games
European Games medalists in gymnastics
European Games gold medalists for Belgium
Medalists at the Acrobatic Gymnastics World Championships
People from Roeselare
Sportspeople from West Flanders